Kat Hoyos is an Australian actress, singer and dancer. She is best known for her role in the television series Here Come The Habibs. She has also appeared in Body in the Yard and was also cast in the short film The Road Home.

Biography
Hoyos was born to a single mother who moved to Australia from Colombia in the mid 1990s.  She attended Mary Mackillop College before moving to Cronulla. Hoyos completed a Bachelor of Creative Arts (Theatre) from the University of Wollongong.

Stage and television 

Hoyos was featured in professional stage roles in the Australian productions of Jersey Boys, Hairspray, Bring It On, Xanadu, and Fame. Her onscreen credits include Here Come the Habibs, Body in the Yard and short film The Road Home. She has been featured in TV commercials for Bonds, the RTA, Pepsi Max, and McDonald's, amongst others. 

Hoyos has performed in music clips for Guy Sebastian, Paulini, Natalie Bassingthwaighte, and worked with choreographers Project Moda, at the Annual Hair Expo for the Schwarzkopf main event. She has made TV appearances including the MTV and Aria Awards, Mornings, The Australian Open Tennis final, The Helpmann Awards, Sunrise, Hey Hey its Saturday, Dancing with The Stars and nationally televised Carols by Candlelight. Hoyos has also collaborated with companies and events like Auto Salon, Sony Ericsson and Nike on shoots and product launches.

Filmography 
  Breathe (Short) (2009)
  Mi hermana (Short) (2011)
  The Road Home (Short) (2013)
  #1 at the Apocalypse Box Office (Short) (2015)
  A Current Affair (TV Series) (2016)
  Here Come the Habibs! (TV Series) (2016-2017)
  Body in the Yard now called "A Suburban Love Story" (post-production)
  Amazing Grace (2021)

References

External links
Here Comes Kat Hoyos - Film Ink
 
 official website

Living people
Australian television actresses
Year of birth missing (living people)
Australian film actresses
21st-century Australian actresses
Australian people of Colombian descent